Acanthodiformes is an order of acanthodian fishes which lived from the Early Devonian to Early Permian.

Subtaxa 

 Family Acanthodidae
 Genus Acanthodes
 Genus Acanthodopsis
 Genus Traquairichthys?
 Genus Utahacanthus?
 Genus Triazeugacanthus
 Family Cheiracanthidae
 Genus Cheiracanthus
 Genus Fallodentus
 Genus Ginkgolepis
 Genus Haplacanthus
 Genus Homalacanthus?
 Genus Markacanthus
 Family Howittacanthidae
 Genus Halimacanthodes
 Genus Howittacanthes
 Family Mesacanthidae
 Genus Lodeacanthus
 Genus Melanoacanthus
 Genus Mesacanthus
 Genus Promesacanthus
 Genus Teneracanthus
 Genus Triazeugacanthus?

References 

Acanthodii
Prehistoric fish orders
Permian fish
Carboniferous fish
Devonian fish
Devonian first appearances
Permian extinctions